Alvernia Studios is a film studio located in Alwernia Municipality, Poland,  west of the Kraków Airport. The studio, with additional offices in Mumbai and Warsaw, produces international features for theatrical release, video games, music projects, and commercials.

History 
The  domed complex features multiple sound stages, the world's biggest spherical shadeless blue screen, music scoring studios, a motion capture system, 16 mm and 35 mm laboratories, a color correction studio, a visual effects department and a final mix studio. Alvernia Studios activities included the production of feature films and commercials, as well as the implementation of music projects (including the smallest concert of the world), video games, shows and concerts.

The studio was founded in 2000 by broadcasting executive Stanisław Tyczyński, a Polish entrepreneur, the founder and former owner of RMF FM. Alvernia Studios was the first non-state film company in post-war Poland.

In 2017, the studio was bought by Grupa Gremi, controlled by the entrepreneur Grzegorz Hajdarowicz. He planned to launch an entertainment center in the buildings, but due to the COVID-19 pandemic, the Alvernia xR project was created. It offers productions using augmented reality.

On November 30, 2021, there was a fire at the plant.

Movies 
 Burning Bush – directed by Agnieszka Holland  (Czech Republic, 2013)
 Bhaag Milkha Bhaag – directed by Rakeysh Omprakash Mehra (India, 2013)
 Arbitrage – directed by Nicholas Jarecki  (USA-Poland, 2012)
 Vamps – directed by Amy Heckerling (USA-Poland, 2012)
 Crulic: The Path to Beyond – directed by Anca Damian (Romania-Poland, 2011)
 Azaan – directed by Prashant Chadha (India, 2011)
 Essential Killing – directed by Jerzy Skolimowski (Ireland-Norway-Poland-Hungary, 2010)

References

External links

 Alvernia Studios – official site
 Movie Scope Magazine about Alvernia Studios
 Vicon products
 Łukasz Maciejewski, Spełniony sen "Smoka" – Article from magazine FILM (pl), June 2010
 Alvernia Studios (en). Imdb. (access 2014-01-24)
 https://archive.today/20140901065841/http://www.wieninternational.at/en/aktuell/into-the-bowels-of-the-monster-en

Polish film studios
Studios in Poland
Film production companies of Poland